FC Titan Klin is an association football team from Klin, Moscow Oblast, Russia. It played professionally from 1992 to 2005. Their best result was 6th place in the Russian Second Division (Zone 3 in 1992 and Zone Center in 2003). As of 2009, they play in Group B of the Moscow Oblast zone of the Amateur Football League (fifth-highest tier).

Team name history
1991–1998: FC Titan Reutov
1999: FC Titan Zheleznodorozhny
2000–2002: FC Titan Reutov
2003–2005: FC Titan Moscow
2006–present: FC Titan Klin

External links
 Team history at KLISF

Association football clubs established in 1991
Football clubs in Russia
Football in Moscow Oblast
1991 establishments in Russia